HFO may refer to:

 HealthForceOntario
 Heavy fuel oil
 Hybrid fibre-optic
 Hydrofluoroolefin, a refrigerant
 Hydrous ferric oxides
 Hypofluorous acid
 Halbleiterwerk Frankfurt (Oder)
 High-frequency oscillations
 Hardy Family Office, a professional wrestling stable led by Matt Hardy